The 2020 Super Taikyu Series is the 29th season of the Super Taikyu Series. The season starts on 23rd March at Suzuka Circuit but was postponed to 4th September at Fuji Speedway due to COVID-19 and the Fuji 24 Hours will serve as the opening round. 

The season was cut short to 5 rounds instead of 6 after a state of emergency in Japan forced to cancel the final round at Suzuka, promoting championship 
leader No.888 Mercedes-AMG Team HIRIX Racing as the Champion with 105 points.

Class Champions

Bold drivers indicate a driver that was entered in every race for their respective team. Drivers listed in italics competed in a select number of rounds for their respective team.

Teams and Drivers

Team Championship standings

Notes:
† – Drivers did not finish the race, but were classified as they completed over 75% of the race distance.

References

External links
 Official website of the Super Taikyu Series

2020 in Japanese motorsport
2020 in TCR Series